Cooks Mills, Ontario can mean the following places:
 Cooks Mills, Niagara Region, Ontario
 Cooks Mills, Nipissing District, Ontario in North Bay
 Spragge, Ontario in Algoma District, previously known as Cook's Mills